Albert Smith may refer to:

Entertainment
 Albert Richard Smith (1816–1860), English author and entertainer
 Albert E. Smith (producer) (1875–1958), English stage magician, film director, and producer
 Albert J. Smith (actor) (1894–1939), American actor

Politics
 Albert Smith (Maine politician) (1793–1867), member of U.S. House of Representatives from Maine
 Albert Smith (New York politician) (1805–1870), member of U.S. House of Representatives from New York
 Albert E. Smith (Wisconsin politician) (1839–?), Wisconsin state assemblyman
 Albert L. Smith Jr. (1931–1997), member of U.S. House of Representatives from Alabama
 Albert James Smith (1822–1883), premier of New Brunswick, Canada 1865–1866
 Albert Edward Smith (1871–1947), Canadian religious leader and politician
 Albert Smith (British politician) (1867–1942), British MP and trade unionist
 Albert Smith (South Australian politician) (1881–1965), member of the Australian House of Representatives
 Albert Smith (New South Wales politician) (1885–1975), member of the New South Wales Legislative Assembly

Sports
 Albert Smith (cricketer) (1863–?), English cricketer
 Albert Smith (footballer, born 1869) (1869–1921), England international
 Albert Smith (footballer, born 1887) (1887–1929), English football winger
 Albert Smith (footballer, born 1900) (1900–?), English footballer
 Albert Smith (footballer, born 1905) (1905–?), Scottish footballer
 A. J. Smith (Albert J. Smith), American football player, coach, scout, and executive

Other
 Albert Charles Smith (1906–1999), American botanist
 Albert Daniel Smith (1887–1970), American pioneer aviator
 Albert Eugene Smith (1907–1973), American computing pioneer
 Albert Hugh Smith (1903–1967), English scholar of Old English and Scandinavian languages
 Albert Joseph Smith (1898–1973), U.S. Marine Corps Medal of Honor recipient
 Albert C. Smith (United States Army officer) (1894–1974), United States Army general
 Albert Alexander Smith (1896–1940), African-American artist
 Albert Smith, a fictional character from Power Rangers Dino Charge

See also
 Albert Smith Medal
 Al Smith (disambiguation)
 George Albert Smith (disambiguation)
 List of people with surname Smith
 Smith (disambiguation)
 Albert E. S. Smythe (1861–1947), Irish-born Canadian journalist, poet, and leader in the theosophy movement